The Saint Spyridon the New Church is a Romanian Orthodox church in Bucharest, Romania on Calea Șerban Vodă, no. 29. Originally built with gothic influences in 1852–1858, it was strongly modified by Patriarch Justinian (especially the towers).

Notable burials
Constantine Hangerli, Prince of Wallachia (died 1799)

Gallery

External links
 Harta Monumentelor Istorice din București - Official site

Romanian Orthodox churches in Bucharest
Historic monuments in Bucharest
Churches completed in 1858
Church buildings with domes